Twin Bridges are two historic bridges located at Danville, Hendricks County, Indiana.  The Hendricks County Bridge #178 is a Baltimore through Truss bridge built in 1887.  The wrought iron bridge measures 149 feet, 6 inches, long and spans White Lick Creek.  The Big Four Railroad Bridge was built by the Big Four Railroad and built in 1906.  It is a three-span concrete structure and spans White Lick Creek and County Road 150 East.  Associated with the bridges is a cut stone railroad abutment built about 1870.

It was added to the National Register of Historic Places in 2000.

References

Road bridges on the National Register of Historic Places in Indiana
Buildings and structures completed in 1870
Bridges completed in 1887
1870 establishments in Indiana
National Register of Historic Places in Hendricks County, Indiana
Transportation buildings and structures in Hendricks County, Indiana
Wrought iron bridges in the United States